Cherokee Pass is an unincorporated community  and census-designated place in Madison County, Missouri, United States. Cherokee Pass is located on U.S. Route 67, approximately four miles south of Fredericktown.

Demographics

References

Census-designated places in Missouri
Unincorporated communities in Madison County, Missouri
Unincorporated communities in Missouri